A billionaire is a person who has a net worth of at least one billion units of a currency.

Billionaire(s) also may refer to:

 Billionaire (card game) or Pit, a commodity-trading card game
 "Billionaire" (song), a song by Travie McCoy ft. Bruno Mars
 "Billionaire", a song by Peaches from I Feel Cream
 Billionaire (Los Angeles, California), a private residence in Bel Air designed by Bruce Makowsky

See also
 Millionaire (disambiguation)